72 Tauri (abbreviated 72 Tau) is a possible binary star in the zodiac constellation of Taurus. It is faintly visible to the naked eye with an apparent visual magnitude of +5.5, although only 0.29° from the brighter υ Tauri.  Based upon an annual parallax shift of  seen from Earth, it is around 410 light years from the Sun.

Properties
72 Tauri is a B-type main sequence star with a stellar classification of B7V.

Occasionally this star system is given the Bayer designation υ2 Tauri with υ Tauri, which is separated from it by 0.29° in the sky.  υ Tauri is a foreground star, the two are unrelated, and although 72 Tauri lies near the Hyades  open cluster, it is much further away.

72 Tauri lies near the ecliptic and can be occulted by the moon. There has been no confirmation of this finding and other sources list the star as single.

References

B-type main-sequence stars
Hyades (star cluster)
Tauri, Upsilon
Taurus (constellation)
Durchmusterung objects
Tauri, 072
020789
028149
1399